Mongeham may refer to the following places in Kent, England:

Great Mongeham
Little Mongeham, AKA Mongeham Parva